Leucopogon tamminensis is a shrub in the family Ericaceae found in Western Australia.

There are two varieties:
Leucopogon tamminensis var. australis E.Pritz
Leucopogon tamminensis E.Pritz var. tamminensis

Description 
Leucopogon tamminensis  is a many branched shrub which may be slender and erect or low spreading. It grows from 0.1m to 0.8 m high, and its white flowers may be seen in January or March or from May to December in its native habitat.

Distribution and habitat 
It is found in the IBRA Regions of  Avon Wheatbelt,  and Esperance Plains, on gravelly soils, deep yellow sand, and clay soils, on Sandplains and hillslopes.

Taxonomy 
It was first described by Ernst Georg Pritzel in 1904 from a specimen found in the Avon district near Tammin on sand-dunes,. and the specific epithet, tamminensis,  refers to this by using the Latin suffix, -ensis ("origin" "place"), to give "from Tammin".

References

External links
Leucopogon tamminensis (Flickr search)

tamminensis
Ericales of Australia
Flora of Western Australia
Plants described in 1904
Taxa named by Ernst Pritzel